Lidia Slăvuțeanu-Șimon (born 4 September 1973) is a Romanian long-distance runner. She competed in the Olympic marathon five times (1996–2012), winning a silver medal at the 2000 Olympics. She is also a former marathon world champion.

Career
Competing in the marathon, she won bronze medals at the World Championships in 1997 and 1999, before finally winning the gold medal in Edmonton 2001. She won a bronze medal over 10,000 metres at the 1998 European Championships.

At the 2000 Summer Olympics in Sydney she won the silver medal behind Naoko Takahashi, Japan but ahead of Joyce Chepchumba, Kenya. Between 2003 and early 2004, she took a break from running to concentrate on her baby.  She returned to compete at the 2004 Summer Olympics, but she failed to finish the race. She finished the 2008 Olympic marathon in eighth place. At the age of 38, she competed in her fifth Olympic marathon (the first woman to do so) in London, finishing 45th overall.

She has been highly successful at the Osaka Ladies Marathon, winning three times consecutively from 1998 to 2000. Her personal best in the marathon came during her win in 2000, in which she finished with a time of 2:22:54. Between 2000 and 2002 she appeared several times on Japanese variety television shows, running handicap races against teams of Japanese TV tarentos. The only person ever to defeat Șimon was her own husband, who, not being a professional athlete, started among one group of tarentos and managed not only to outrun all the TV stars but to cross the finish line with 30 seconds left of his 5-minute headstart over Lidia, to a standing ovation from the Japanese audience.

Șimon has experienced much success at the IAAF World Half Marathon Championships, taking individual silver and team gold at her first championships in 1996. She went on to take individual bronze medals at the 1997, 1998 and 2000 editions of the championships, in addition to further team gold and silver medals with Romania. Her personal best time of 1:08:34 hours over the distance is the Romanian record.

She was the winner at the first edition of the combined Osaka Marathon in October 2011.

Among other achievements on the international road racing circuit, she won the Bolder Boulder 10K and Sapporo Half Marathon in 1999 and 2001, the Boilermaker Road Race and Shanghai Marathon in 2007.

Achievements

References

External links

1973 births
Living people
People from Târgu Cărbunești
Romanian female long-distance runners
Romanian female marathon runners
Athletes (track and field) at the 1996 Summer Olympics
Athletes (track and field) at the 2000 Summer Olympics
Athletes (track and field) at the 2004 Summer Olympics
Athletes (track and field) at the 2008 Summer Olympics
Athletes (track and field) at the 2012 Summer Olympics
Olympic athletes of Romania
Olympic silver medalists for Romania
Romanian expatriate sportspeople in the United States
World Athletics Championships medalists
European Athletics Championships medalists
Medalists at the 2000 Summer Olympics
Olympic silver medalists in athletics (track and field)
World Athletics Championships winners